The Depositors' and Investors' Guarantee Fund (Icelandic: Tryggingarsjóður innstæðueigenda og fjárfesta) is the statutory deposit insurance scheme in Iceland. It is established under Act No. 98/1999 on Deposit Guarantees and Investor-Compensation Scheme, which transposes European Union directives 94/19/EC and 97/9/EC into Icelandic law, in accordance with the decisions of the European Economic Area.

See also
 Icesave dispute

References

External links 
Official site
Financial statement 2007

Banking in Iceland
Deposit insurance
1999 establishments in Iceland